Tău may refer to several places in Romania:

 Tău, a village in Roșia de Secaș Commune, Alba County
 Tău, a village in Zau de Câmpie Commune, Mureș County
 Tău (river), a river in Caraș-Severin County